The United States motorcycle Grand Prix was a round of the FIM Grand Prix motorcycle racing World Championship.

History

The first United States Grand Prix was held in 1961 as a non-championship race at the Daytona International Speedway on the 2-mile or 3.2 kilometre long motorcycle course. This continued until 1964 when it acquired an official spot on the World Championship calendar as the season opener. This marked the first time that Grand Prix motorcycle racing raced on the North American continent. Spectator attendance for this race was low as there was little interest from the American public, who preferred the championship organized by the American Motorcyclist Association and as a result was not interested in the "European" style of racing. In 1965 the U.S. Grand Prix returned for the second time at Daytona, but privateers were unable to pay for the trip to the United States and few Americans went to see the race due to the lack of interest in the majority European-styled championship. As a result of the lack of interest from the American public, top teams and riders, the United States Grand Prix was removed from the 1966 season.

After a 23-year absence, the U.S. Grand Prix returned for the 1988 season on the Laguna Seca Raceway. That year's event was marred with problems as many especially European riders complained about the bumpyness of an old part of the track and the dangerously close barriers and concrete blocs that surrounded the circuit. Some European riders even considered to not participate in the race on Sunday while the American riders had no problems with the circuit as they had more experience. The 1989 season didn't fare much better as the organization was once again poor - there were problems with the prize- and start money, tickets and timekeeping. Against the rules some sold tickets in front of the riders' quarter's, the prize money was unusual, the supply roads were insufficient and kept getting altered and the timekeeping produced useful times only after 18 hours. On top of that, the American organizers wanted to include a sidecar race in their program but refused to pay the extra travel expenses. While last year's bumpy section had been reprofiled for 1989, riders still complained it was dangerous - especially Turns 11, 1 and 2. During the race, an ambulance drove on the track in dangerous manner to assist the crashed out Wayne Gardner who had broken his leg after a heavy shunt exiting Turn 5, with no yellow flags being shown to the riders. On the cooldown lap a bizarre incident occurred: American Bubba Shobert hit the back of Kevin Magee's bike at high speed after he failed to see the Australian. Magee had stopped in the middle of the track behind a blind hill after he ran out of fuel to do a rear-wheel burnout, but Shobert was not looking forward as he was congratulating Eddie Lawson, who himself narrowly missed Magee. As Shobert lay motionless in the sand, a visibly distraught Lawson tried to help him. The American was brought to the hospital with severe head injuries and Magee was also recovered with a broken ankle and lower leg. Shobert would never race again after this incident while Magee was forced to miss both the Spanish and Italian rounds that year. In 1990 the track of the U.S. Grand Prix had undergone various upgrades but riders still complained some points were dangerous. On lap two, Magee suffered a heavy accident whilst being in the top positions, his second in two years at this circuit. The race had to be red flagged to allow an ambulance to enter the circuit, where the Australian was taken to the hospital with severe head trauma. There he was operated and a blood clot in his brain was surgically removed, after which he was kept in an artificial coma for some time. The accident meant he was out of the 1990 season. In 1992 the United States GP was taken off the calendar in favour of other venues preferred by Bernie Ecclestone, who was increasingly involved in Grand Prix motorcycle racing at the time. For the 1993 season however the event returned for two more years as Ecclestone focused more on Formula 1 again. In 1995 the race was scheduled to be held on August 6, but was eventually scrapped due to financial problems and complaints from riders about the dangerous circuit.

After a ten year hiatus, the event was brought back for the third time in 2005 on the same circuit as before - Laguna Seca. The track had undergone the needed updates and safety requirements and was now considered to be safe enough to host a U.S. Grand Prix again. Due to a Californian law on air pollution, only the 4-stroke MotoGP bikes were allowed to participate. The race was famously won by home hero Nicky Hayden. In 2006 Hayden once again won his home race. The 2008 United States Grand Prix saw a thrilling battle between Valentino Rossi and Casey Stoner, the race being won by the Italian in the end. In 2014, the United States could only support two events (the Indianapolis Grand Prix and Motorcycle Grand Prix of the Americas were also scheduled at this time) and the organizers, as a not-for-profit, could no longer compete with either circuits. As a result, they couldn't keep up with Dorna's ever increasing financial demands and Laguna Seca was taken off the calendar despite having a contract for that year.

During the last existence of the U.S. Grand Prix, two other races co-existed with each other for one season in 2013 - the Indianapolis Grand Prix and the Grand Prix of the Americas. The first Grand Prix existed from 2008 until 2015 and the second one still is held today, only being cancelled in 2020 after the outbreak of the COVID-19 pandemic.

Official names and sponsors

1965: Grand Prix of United States (no official sponsor)
1988: The United States International Grand Prix (no official sponsor)
1989: The Dunlop USGP
1990: The U.S. Budweiser International Grand Prix
1991: The Honda And Yamaha Motorcycles United States International Grand Prix
1993: USGP (no official sponsor)
1994: United States Motorcycle Grand Prix (no official sponsor)
2005–2013: Red Bull U.S. Grand Prix

Spectator attendance

2005: 57,932

Formerly used circuits

Past winners
A pink background indicates an event that was not part of the Grand Prix motorcycle racing championship.

Multiple winners (riders)

Multiple winners (manufacturers)

By year

References

 
Recurring sporting events established in 1961
Recurring sporting events disestablished in 2013
1961 establishments in Florida
2013 disestablishments in California